Frisco is a city in Collin and Denton counties in the U.S. state of Texas. Its population was 200,509 at the 2020 U.S. census.

Frisco was the fastest-growing city in the United States in 2017, and also from 2000 to 2009. In the late 1990s, the northern DFW suburban development tide hit the northern border of Plano and spilled into Frisco, sparking rapid growth into the 2000s. Like many of the cities in Dallas's northern exurbs, Frisco serves as a bedroom community for professionals who work in DFW. Since 2003, Frisco has received the designation Tree City USA from the National Arbor Day Foundation.

The United States Census Bureau defines an urban area of northern Dallas-area suburbs that are separated from the Dallas–Forth Worth urban area, with McKinney and Frisco as the principal cities: the McKinney–Frisco, TX urban area had a population of 504,803 as of the 2020 census, ranked 83rd in the United States.

History
When the Dallas area was being settled by American pioneers, many of the settlers traveled by wagon trains along the Shawnee Trail. This trail became the Preston Trail, and later Preston Road. With all this activity, the community of Lebanon was founded along this trail, and was granted a U.S. post office in 1860.

In 1902, a line of the St. Louis-San Francisco Railway was being built through the area, and periodic watering stops were needed along the route for the steam locomotives. The current settlement of Lebanon was on the Preston Ridge, and was too high in elevation, so the watering stop was placed about 4 miles (6 km) to the west on lower ground. A community grew around this train stop. Some Lebanon residents moved their houses to the new community on logs. The new town was originally named Emerson, but the U.S. Postal Service rejected the name as too similar to another community, Emberson, in Lamar County.

In 1904, the town's residents chose "Frisco City" in honor of the St. Louis–San Francisco Railway. This name was later shortened to Frisco.

Geography
Frisco is within the Dallas–Fort Worth metroplex, partially in Denton and Collin counties, in North Texas.

Frisco is part of the humid subtropical region. The city gets  of precipitation per year. On average, 230 days per year are sunny. The comfort index, which is based on humidity during the hot months, is a 25 out of 100, where higher is more comfortable.

Demographics

As of the 2020 United States census, there were 200,509 people, 64,151 households, and 48,519 families residing in the city, up from 2010's tabulation of 116,989.

Among the population, the 2019 American Community Survey estimated 51.9% were non-Hispanic or Latino white, 8.4% Black or African American, 0.2% American Indian and Alaska Native, 26.0% Asian alone, 0.1% Native Hawaiian or other Pacific Islander, 2.7% two or more races, and 10.7% Hispanic and Latino American of any race. By 2020, 48% of the population were non-Hispanic white, 8.82% Black or African American, 0.3% Native American, 26.27% Asian, 0.05% Pacific Islander, 0.52% some other race, 4.55% multiracial, and 11.48% Hispanic or Latino of any race.

According to a 2010 American Community Survey estimate, the median income for a household in the city was $100,868, the median income for a family was $109,086. The per capita income for the city was $38,048. About 2.2% of families and 5.8% of the population were below the poverty line, including 7.5% of those under age 18 and 2.4% of those age 65 or over. The median price for a new home was $252,000. By 2019, its median income grew to $116,884.

Economy

Retail establishments and restaurants line Preston Road, one of the city's major north–south traffic arteries.

Frisco took a different economic track than many surrounding cities, electing to use a fractional percent of local sales tax to fund the Frisco Economic Development Corporation (FEDC) rather than Dallas Area Rapid Transit (DART), the regional transportation body. The effectiveness of the FEDC, whose primary purpose is to reallocate such tax dollars to commercial ventures, is a matter of public debate.

Frisco Square, a mixed-use development, became the new downtown along with the city hall. The major development in the project is the new city hall, main library, and public commons. A Cinemark theater opened in 2010. In 2012, a hospital, Medical City Plano-Frisco, was built north of the theater.

Major employers
Frisco's top employers as of 2019 were the following:

Arts and culture

Frisco hosts the Museum of the American Railroad, which is based out of the Frisco Heritage Museum while construction on a separate museum complex continues. The nearby Discovery Center features an art gallery, a black-box theater, and the National Videogame Museum.

Frisco Square hosts a variety of events throughout the year including Arts in the Square, Music in the Square, and the annual Christmas in the Square holiday light show (the largest choreographed lights and music show in North Texas). The city hall also hosts a Music in the Chamber concert series in the city council chamber.

Sports
Frisco is home to several sporting venues, many major sports teams headquarters, and an NCAA Division I conference headquarters. In April 2011, Men's Journal named Frisco the Best Place to Raise an Athlete.

Venues

The Ford Center at the Star is a 12,000-seat indoor stadium. The 91-acre Dallas Cowboys project "The Star" includes the team's headquarters and training facilities, including the Ford Center, where the Cowboys practice and Frisco ISD high school teams practice and play on a rotating basis. It is on Gaylord Parkway, one block west of the Dallas North Tollway. Multiple professional teams have made their home at the Ford Center, including the Texas Revolution of Champions Indoor Football and the Dallas Rattlers of Major League Lacrosse.

Riders Field, a 10,316-seat baseball stadium, hosted its first baseball game on April 3, 2003. BaseballParks.com named it the best new ballpark that year, and it received the 2003 Texas Construction award for Best Architectural Design.

Toyota Stadium, which opened in 2005 as "Pizza Hut Park", is a 20,500-seat stadium. It is primarily used as a soccer stadium by FC Dallas, but also hosts concerts and high school and college football games, including the NCAA Division I-AA (FCS) college football championship starting in 2010 and the NCAA Division I (FBS) Frisco Bowl starting in 2017.

The Comerica Center (formerly Dr Pepper Arena), a combination hockey and basketball venue, is the home of the Texas Legends of the NBA G League and the Frisco Fighters of the Indoor Football League, and a practice facility for the Dallas Stars of the NHL.
The Dallas Cowboys of the National Football League (NFL) moved their corporate headquarters to "The Star" in Frisco in time for the 2016 NFL football season; the complex opened in June 2016. Built in partnership with Frisco ISD, which contributed $30 million to building the Ford Center at the Star in lieu of a dedicated third football stadium, Frisco ISD has held high school football games at the Ford Center since it opened.

Multiple professional indoor football teams have previously been based in Frisco, including the Frisco Thunder of the Intense Football League and the Texas Revolution of Champions Indoor Football.

In 2020 a new Indoor Football League expansion franchise, the Frisco Fighters, debuted with home games to be played at Comerica Center. After the Fighters' 2020 season was canceled due to the COVID-19 pandemic, the team played its inaugural home opener on June 5, 2021. In their first year of operation, the Fighters clinched a playoff berth, advancing as far as the IFL semifinal game against the eventual 2021 United Bowl champion Massachusetts Pirates.

The Dallas Stars National Hockey League team is headquartered in Frisco, and practices at the Comerica Center. The Texas Tornado of the North American Hockey League had been based in Frisco since the fall of 2003, and shortly afterward the league moved its main offices to Frisco. In the 2013 off-season, the Texas Tornado relocated to North Richland Hills, Texas. The league relocated its offices in 2018.
FC Dallas (formerly the Dallas Burn), a Major League Soccer team, moved its home to Pizza Hut Park (now Toyota Stadium) near the corner of the Dallas North Tollway and Main Street in August 2005. A major international youth soccer tournament, the Dallas Cup, is hosted in Frisco each year and draws teams from around the world. The National Soccer Hall of Fame is co-located with Toyota Stadium.
The Frisco RoughRiders, the Double-A Minor League Baseball affiliate of the Texas Rangers in the South Division of the Texas League, play in Frisco at Riders Field.

The Texas Legends, affiliated with the Dallas Mavericks, are members of the NBA G League and play at Comerica Center.

On November 16, 2017, Major League Lacrosse announced it would be moving the Rochester Rattlers franchise to The Ford Center at the Star in Frisco for the 2018 season as the Dallas Rattlers. The Rattlers folded after the 2019 season.

The Southland Conference, an NCAA Division I athletics organization, relocated its headquarters to Frisco in 2006. On February 26, 2010, Pizza Hut Park (now Toyota Stadium) was announced as the host of the Football Championship Subdivision (formerly NCAA Division I-AA) championship game, formerly held in Chattanooga, Tennessee, and Huntington, West Virginia. The first matchup, hosted by the Southland Conference, was played January 7, 2011.

Others
Frisco also has an Olympic-sized, state-of-the-art natatorium. The Frisco Baseball and Softball Association was established in 1984. The Frisco Football League is an organized recreational league that allows children to play football before entering football in the school district. The Flagfootball4fun Flag Football League (FF4FUN) is an organized recreational youth flag football league. The sports entertainment conglomerate Dude Perfect is in Frisco.

Parks and recreation
It features exercise equipment, basketball courts, and group exercise classes.

On January 11, 2023, Universal Destinations & Experiences announced a "new concept"-styled theme park to be constructed in Frisco.

Government

Local government
Frisco is a "home rule" city. Frisco voters adopted its initial "home rule" charter in 1987. Frisco residents have voted to amend the charter three times since 1987:
 May 2002, approved 19 propositions
 May 2010, approved 14 propositions
 May 2019, approved 24 propositions
In May 2014, the Charter Review Commission recommended an additional 14 propositions, but these were never placed on the ballots.

The form of government adopted by Frisco is the council-manager, which consists of a mayor and six city council members elected at-large and a city manager. Council members' duties include enacting local legislation (ordinances), adopting budgets, determining policies, and appointing the city manager. The mayor and city council members each serve three year terms, with term limits of three terms. There have only been two city managers in Frisco history: George Purefoy served for over 34 years before his retirement in 2022, when he was replaced by current city manager Wes Pierson.

According to the city's 2010 Comprehensive Annual Financial Report, the city's various funds had $227.2 million in revenues, $184.4 million in expenditures, $1.647 billion in total assets, $753.1 million in total liabilities, and $159.3 million in cash and investments.

The city of Frisco is a voluntary member of the North Central Texas Council of Governments, the purpose of which is to coordinate individual and collective local governments and facilitate regional solutions, eliminate unnecessary duplication, and enable joint decisions.

Mayors

State government
After the 2021 state and federal redistricting, Frisco contains most or parts of Texas State House of Representatives districts 57, 61, 66 and 106. Frisco contains parts of Texas State Senate districts 8 and 30.

Federal government
After the 2021 state and federal redistricting, Frisco contains parts of United States Congressional districts 3, 4, and 26.

Education

Primary and secondary
Most of Frisco is in the Frisco Independent School District (Frisco ISD), with some parts of the city extending into the Lewisville Independent School District, Little Elm Independent School District, and Prosper Independent School District. Lewisville ISD operates one elementary campus in the city while Prosper ISD operates an elementary school, a middle school, and Rock Hill High School, a high school within the Frisco city limits.

Frisco ISD has 12 high schools 17 middle schools and 43 elementary schools, and 3 special programs centers. Most Frisco ISD schools are within the Frisco city limits, but some are in adjacent suburbs, such as Plano. All Frisco high schools compete in UIL Class 5A, with the exception of Panther Creek High School, which competes in Class 4A.

The Frisco ISD Early Childhood School is available for children ages three and four who meet eligibility requirements for Headstart, Prekindergarten, or Preschool Program for Children with Disabilities.

At the Frisco ISD Career and Technical Education Center, high school students can experience and try different careers, from veterinary work to advertising and graphic design.

Higher education
The Texas Legislature designated Collin College as the community college for the municipality of Frisco as well as all of Collin County. The Preston Ridge campus of the community college district opened on Wade Boulevard in Frisco in 1995. Amberton University has a local campus on Parkwood Boulevard north of Warren Parkway. In 2008, Frisco ISD opened the Career and Technology Education Center.

The University of Dallas moved its Carrollton campus to Frisco. UT Arlington has a professional MBA campus in Frisco. The University of North Texas core MBA courses can be taken at the Frisco campus.

Infrastructure

Major highways
  (Service Road is Dallas Parkway)
  (Service Road is )
  (Preston Road)
  (University Drive)
  (U.S. Army Sergeant Enrique Mondragon Memorial Highway)

Notable people

Politicians
 Pat Fallon, member of the United States House of Representatives for Congressional District 4 (2021–present) and former Frisco city council member (2009–2013)
 Jared Patterson, member of the Texas State House of Representatives for District 106 (2018–present)

Entertainers, artists, and celebrities
 King Diamond, Danish heavy metal musician and vocalist of Mercyful Fate
 Courtney Gibbs, Miss Texas USA 1988 and Miss USA 1988
 Maelyn Jarmon, winner of the 16th season of The Voice
 Cheyenne Kimball, a former Gloriana band member

Sports
 Jay Ajayi, former National Football League running back for the Miami Dolphins and Philadelphia Eagles
 Jack Anderson, professional American football player for the Philadelphia Eagles
 Marion Barber III, former National Football League running back for the Dallas Cowboys and Chicago Bears
 Ben Bishop, professional ice hockey goaltender for the Dallas Stars
 Nick Bolton, professional football player for the Kansas City Chiefs
 Bobby Crues, American baseball player
 Dawson Deaton, professional American football player for the Cleveland Browns
 Ezekiel Elliott, professional football player for the Dallas Cowboys
 Elliott Fry, professional football player, currently a free agent.
 Lamar Jordan, former professional football player for the Atlanta Falcons
 Matt Lepsis, former National Football League player for the Denver Broncos and Super Bowl XXXIII winner
 Kene Nwangwu, professional football player for the Minnesota Vikings
 Ryan O’Hearn, professional baseball player for The Kansas City Royals
 Red Patterson, former professional baseball player for the Los Angeles Dodgers

In popular culture
In 1978, the first season of Dallas was filmed at Frisco's Cloyce Box Ranch (now the Brinkmann Ranch), where the house on site was used as the Ewing family home. This house burned down during renovations in 1987, and the steel skeleton of the house still stands on today's Brinkmann Ranch, now the largest family-owned estate in Frisco.

Notes

References

External links

 
 Frisco Economic Development Corporation

 
Cities in the Dallas–Fort Worth metroplex
Cities in Texas
Cities in Collin County, Texas
Cities in Denton County, Texas
Populated places established in 1904
1904 establishments in Texas